Nechirvan Idris Barzani (born 21 September 1966) is a Kurdish politician serving as the second President of Kurdistan Region, Iraq. He was elected into office by the Kurdistan Region Parliament in June 2019. Nechirvan Barzani was appointed as Vice President of the Kurdistan Democratic Party since 2010. He previously served as Prime Minister of the Kurdistan Regional Government from March 2007 to August 2009 and March 2012 to May 2019.
Nechirvan Barzani is also the founder of the University Of Kurdistan - Hewler, the region's top ranking university located in Erbil. His rule combines aspects of Kurdish nationalism, secularism, modernism and reforms, reforms in agriculture and women's rights.

Early years
Nechirvan Barzani was born in 1966 in Barzan, Kurdistan Region. The name Nêçîrvan means hunter. Barzani's surname originates from his birthplace of Barzan. He is the grandson of Mustafa Barzani, a legendary Kurdish leader who led the Kurdish Revolution and armed resistance against the regimes of Iraq and was also the founder of the Kurdistan Democratic Party (KDP).

Nechirvan Barzani's father, Idris Mustafa Barzani, was a senior KDP leader and prominent political figure, he dedicated his entire life to fighting for the rights and freedoms of the Kurdish people alongside his father and brother Masoud Barzani, who served as the first president of the Kurdistan Region. In 1975, Nechirvan Barzani and his family, along with tens of thousands of Kurds living under Iraqi rule, were forced into exile into Iran to seek safety from Iraq's Ba’ath regime which committed mass killings, forced displacement, cultural genocide, and tremendous brutality as part of its policies culminating with the Anfal genocide.

Following the footsteps of his father, uncle, and grandfather, Nechirvan Barzani became actively involved in Kurdish activism and politics. Often accompanying his father on official political visits to Middle Eastern and European countries lobbying for the Kurdish cause, he began developing his platform of political positions based on bringing about peace, stability, and justice to the Kurdish people.

Education and personal life
Nechirvan Barzani studied politics and international relations at the University of Tehran, Iran. He was awarded an honorary Doctor of Public Service degree from Washington and Jefferson College in Pennsylvania, the United States in a ceremony held on 17 May 2008. Nechirvan Barzani is fluent in Kurdish, Persian, and English. He is fond of Kurdish and Persian poetry and literature. He is married to Nabila Barzani and they have five children together.

Political career

Nechirvan Barzani was first elected to the KDP central committee at its tenth Congress in 1989 and re-elected at the 11th Congress in 1993, when he assumed a position in the political bureau. After the 1991 Gulf War, he participated in negotiations with the Iraqi government.

In 1996, Nechirvan Barzani was appointed Deputy Prime Minister of the Kurdistan Regional Government (KRG), established following the 1992 regional elections. In 1999, Nechirvan Barzani was appointed as Prime Minister of the Kurdistan Regional Government. He actively participated in the 2005 unification process between the main Kurdish Parties on forming a unified KRG.

Prime Minister (2006–2009)
In March 2006, Nechirvan Barzani lead the fifth cabinet, the first unified cabinet of the Kurdistan Regional Government. Many of Barzani's supporters believe that he played an important role in developing the Kurdistan Region. During his first term as Prime Minister, his supporters nicknamed his cabinet as "The Development Cabinet" praising his work in the development of the Kurdistan Region. From September 2009 through January 2012, a Kurdish politician from the ruling KDP–PUK coalition, Barham Salih, assumed office as Prime Minister of the KRG.

Prime Minister (2012–2019)
Nechirvan Barzani was re-elected as Prime Minister in 2012. His political priorities focused on improving the standard of living in the Kurdistan Region, and strengthening peace, security, stability, foreign relations, and foreign investments. He presided consolidation and promotion of rights for women, as well as the ethnic and religious groups in the Region. Under his tenure, the Kurdistan Region underwent a widespread development program in its electricity, water, housing, and road infrastructure. During his tenure, more than thirty countries established their official representation offices in the Kurdistan Region.

In 2014, the war against the Islamic State impacted the Kurdistan Region. In addition to defense, the Kurdistan Region also hosted nearly two million displaced people who sought refuge in Kurdistan. Also, with the fall in international oil prices and Iraq's failure to deliver the Region's budget portion, the Region also entered a massive economic crisis. Barzani successfully used diplomatic means to rebuild relations with Baghdad and resume budgetary allotments peacefully.

Following the 2017 Kurdistan independence referendum, the Federal Iraqi Government took hostile policies and military actions against the Kurdistan Region. Barzani used his position to again normalize relations with Baghdad and to strengthen ties with the international community with an increased international diplomacy effort.

Nechirvan Barzani is also the Founder of the University Of Kurdistan Hewler, known as (UKH), the highest ranked university in the region. He served as Chancellor of the institute from 2010 to 2019, with Dr. Mohammed Mochtar as his Vice Chancellor.

President of the Kurdistan Region (2019–present)

On 28 May 2019, out of 81 MPs who participated at the session, Nechirvan Barzani was elected as the President of Kurdistan Region by the votes of 68 MPs. Nechirvan Barzani was inaugurated as President of the Kurdistan Region in June 2019. Citing democracy as one of the Kurdistan Region's greatest achievements, in his inauguration speech he stated his duty as President of the Kurdistan Region is to continue strengthening Kurdistan's democratic values and developing the government's political, social and economic policies to improve those sectors as well as education, healthcare, and industry.

He has been recognized for his promotion of the rights of all ethnic and religious groups, continued inter-faith dialogue, and women's rights. For this reason, Nechirvan Barzani received support from the various ethnic and religious groups in the Kurdistan Region who believe his presidency enhances the likelihood that they will continue to be treated fairly with equal rights and freedoms in Kurdistan Region. His election as president signaled a mandate by the Kurdistan Region Parliament to continue advancing fair and equal treatment under his leadership. This has positioned Kurdistan as a leader that serves as an example for other nations in the Middle East.

President Barzani affirmed during his inauguration speech that he will continue plans to build solidarity with neighboring countries, strengthen relations with the international community, and to work closely with the federal government in Baghdad to jointly agree on solutions within the framework of the Constitution of Iraq.

As President, Nechirvan Barzani remains dedicated to continue his Yezidi rescue mission. Barzani established a special office in 2014 devoted to rescuing Yezidi survivors in ISIS terrorist captivity. More than 3,340 Yezidi victims have been liberated with the support of the office.

See also
 Kurdistan
 Kurdistan Regional Government
 Kurdistan Democratic Party
 Mustafa Barzani
 Idris Barzani
 Masoud Barzani
 Masrour Barzani
 Barzani Family

References

External links
 

|-

|-

|-

1966 births
Presidents of Kurdistan Region
Prime Ministers of Kurdistan Region
Iraqi Kurdish people
Kurdish nationalists
Living people
People from Barzan
University of Tehran alumni
Kurdistan Democratic Party politicians